Biophilia may refer to:

 Biophilia hypothesis, the suggestion that there is an instinctive bond between human beings and other living systems
 Biophilia, a 1984 book by E. O. Wilson presenting the above hypothesis
 Biophilia (album), a 2011 album by Björk